Irene Aebi (born 27 July 1939 in Zurich, Switzerland) is a Swiss singer, violinist and cellist. She is noted for her work with jazz saxophonist Steve Lacy, her husband, from the 1960s to his death in 2004.

Initially a classically trained instrumentalist, she only began to sing at Lacy's request. In a review of a 1999 concert, critic Frank Rubolino describes Aebi as possessing a "brusque, forceful style of singing".

Discography
With Steve Lacy
 Moon (BYG, 1971)
 Wordless (Futura, 1971)
 The Gap (America, 1972)
 Estilhacos (Guilda Da Musica, 1972)
 Roba (Saravah, 1972)
 Scraps (Saravah, 1974)
 Dreams (Saravah, 1975)
 Flakes (RCA, 1975)
 Songs  (Musica, 1977)
 Follies (FMP, 1978)
 Troubles (Black Saint, 1979)
 Stamps (Hat Hut, 1979)
 Crops & the Woe (Quark & Books, 1979)
 The Owl (Saravah, 1979)
 The Way (Hat Hut, 1980)
 Songs with Brion Gysin (Hat ART, 1981)
 Ballets (Hat ART, 1982)
 Prospectus (Hat ART, 1983)
 Blinks (Hat Hut, 1984)
 The Condor (Soul Note, 1986)
 The Gleam (Silkheart, 1987)
 Momentum (Novus, 1987)
 The Door (Novus, 1989)
 Itinerary (Hat ART, 1991)
 Live at Sweet Basil (Novus/RCA, 1992)
 Clangs (Hat ART, 1993)
 Vespers (Soul Note, 1993)
 Weal & Woe (Emanem, 1995)
 The Cry (Soul Note, 1999)
 Monk's Dream (Verve, 2000)
 Gravensteen Ghent 1971 (Naked Music, 2004)
 Esteem: Live in Paris 1975 (Atavistic, 2006)

With others
 Takashi Kako, Micro Worlds (Trio, 1976)
 Alan Silva, Seasons (BYG, 1971)
 Mal Waldron, Mal Waldron with the Steve Lacy Quintet (America, 1972)

References

1939 births
Living people
Swiss jazz musicians
Musicians from Zürich